Karsten Stolz (born 23 July 1964 in Oberhausen, North Rhine-Westphalia) is a retired West German shot putter.

Career
Stolz represented the sports club TV Wattenscheid, and became West German champion in 1984, 1986, 1987, 1988 and 1989. His personal best throw was 21.15 metres, achieved in September 1988 in Essen.

Stolz is 2.08 metres tall, and during his active career he weighed 142 kg.

International competitions

References

1964 births
Living people
Sportspeople from Oberhausen
West German male shot putters
Athletes (track and field) at the 1984 Summer Olympics
Olympic athletes of West Germany